Özer is made up of the Turkish öz meaning "core, essence" and er meaning "private, soldier". Ozer is also a personal name or surname in Jewish culture. Özer may refer to:

Given name
Özer Ateşçi (born 1942), Turkish alpine skier
Chaim Ozer Grodzinski (1863–1940), Av beis din, posek, Talmudic scholar in Vilnius, Lithuania
 Özer Hurmacı, Turkish-German football player
 Ozer Schild (1930-2006), Danish-born Israeli academic, President of the University of Haifa and President of the College of Judea and Samaria ("Ariel College").
 Özer Türkmen, Turkish general in charge of the armies of the Turkish Republic of Northern Cyprus
Özer Umdu (born 1952), Turkish retired professional football player

Surname
Aykut Özer (born 1993), Turkish footballer
Bilal Aziz Özer (born 1985), Lebanese-Turkish footballer
Cem Özer (born 1959), Turkish actor
Cenk Enes Özer, Turkish author
Cevher Özer (born 1983), Turkish professional basketball player
Dodrupchen Jigme Trinle Ozer (1745–1821), Nyingma tertön who was the "heart-son" of Jigme Lingpa
Hasan Özer (1 October 1974), Turkish former footballer and currently a football manager
Hasibe Erkoç, née Özer, a Turkish female boxer
Hüseyin Özer (born 1949), Turkish British executive chef and restaurateur
Josef Özer (born 1983), Aramean Swedish-Syriac musician
Kenan Özer (born 1987), Turkish footballer
Özalp Özer, American business professor specializing in pricing science and operations research
Şehmus Özer (1980–2016), Turkish professional footballer
Zerrin Özer (born 1957), Turkish pop singer
Zülküf Özer (born 1988), Turkish footballer

References

Turkish-language surnames
Turkish masculine given names